Isabella de Luna (died 1564) was an Italian (originally Spanish) courtesan of Renaissance-era Rome. She was known as amusing company, having a kind heart but also a foul tongue. She was an accomplished musician. Amongst her patrons were members of the nobility and cardinals.

Biography
Isabella was originally from Granada in Spain. She followed a soldier in the Imperial army of Charles V, Holy Roman Emperor, where she prostituted herself as a camp follower and was present at the Conquest of Tunis in 1535. Around 1536 she eventually settled in Rome, where she acquired a house in 1544 and became known as the most famous high class courtesan, or cortigiana onesta, of her generation. 

As with all courtesans of her class, she had a main client, in her case Roberto Strozzi. Other clients included Cardinal Carafa, the Marquis de Montebello, Cardinal Farnese and author Matteo Bandello. According to Pierre Brantome, she was herself a client of one of her colleagues, Pandora, reputed to be one of the most beautiful in Rome, whom she paid for sexual services. A famous incident took place on a party, were Rocco Biancalana lost a bet to her after he had promised to make her blush, but in which she instead won the bet.

Isabella de Luna was portrayed in two contemporary novels by Matteo Bandello. One of which was Lives of Gallant Ladies.

Transgresions
In 1555 de Luna was accused of holding a child captive in her house. Before being arrested she fled. She was captured in Rimini whilst on her way to Venice and returned to Rome's Castel Sant'Angelo to await trial. Two years later, in 1557 she was a witness at the trial of Roman nobleman Pompeo Giustini.

During an official crackdown on morality, de Luna and Pandora were arrested and the Pope threatened to burn them at the stake. On another occasion she faced imprisoned for debt but managed to pay the merchant she owed the money before she was incarcerated. However, as she had pretended to use the summons for toilet-paper and appeared before the judge drunk, she was sentenced to a public lashing of 50 strokes on her bare buttocks.

References

Bibliography
 
 
 
 
 
 
 
 
 
 
 

Italian courtesans
1564 deaths
Year of birth missing
16th-century Italian women
Italian LGBT people
16th-century LGBT people